Hugo Magnetti (born 30 May 1998) is a French professional footballer who plays as a midfielder for French club Stade Brestois 29 in the Ligue 1.

Career
Born in Marseille, Magnetti spent his youth career with various local clubs in his hometown before moving to SC Bastia in Corsica at 16. On 31 May 2018, he joined Stade Brestois 29 in the French Ligue 2. He made his professional debut with Brest in a 1–0 Ligue 2 loss to FC Metz on 30 July 2018.

References

External links
 
 

1998 births
Living people
French footballers
Footballers from Marseille
Association football midfielders
Ligue 1 players
Ligue 2 players
Championnat National 2 players
Stade Brestois 29 players
SC Bastia players
French people of Italian descent